William Floyd Collins (July 20, 1887 –  February 13, 1925) was an American cave explorer, principally in a region of Kentucky that houses hundreds of miles of interconnected caves, today a part of Mammoth Cave National Park, the longest known cave system in the world.

In the early 20th century, in an era known as the Kentucky Cave Wars, spelunkers and property owners entered into bitter competition to exploit the bounty of caves for commercial profit from tourists, who paid to see the caves. In 1917 and 1918, Collins discovered and commercialized Great Crystal Cave in the Flint Ridge Cave System, but the cave was remote and visitors were few. Collins had an ambition to find another cave he could open to the public closer to the main roads, and entered into an agreement with a neighbor to open up Sand Cave, a small cave on the neighbor's property.

The rescue operation to save him became a national media sensation and one of the first major news stories to be reported using the new technology of broadcast radio. After four days, during which rescuers were able to bring water and food to Collins, a rock collapse in the cave closed the entrance passageway, stranding him inside, except for voice contact, for more than two weeks. Collins died of thirst and hunger compounded by exposure through hypothermia after being isolated for fourteen days, and three days before a rescue shaft reached his position. Collins' body was recovered two months later.

Although Collins was an unknown figure for most of his lifetime, the fame he gained from the rescue efforts and his death led to him being memorialized on his tombstone as the "Greatest Cave Explorer Ever Known".

Early life

William Floyd Collins was born on July 20, 1887
He was the third child of Leonidas "Lee" Collins and Martha Jane Burnett, who gave birth to eight children: Elizabeth (died at three months of age), James "Jim", Floyd, Annie, Andy Lee, Marshall, Nellie, and Homer. Floyd began entering caves by himself at the age of six in search of Native American artifacts to sell to tourists at the Mammoth Cave Hotel. In 1910 Floyd discovered his first cave, Donkey's Cave, on the Collins farm. In 1912, Edmund Turner, a geologist, hired Floyd to show him caves of the region. Consequently, Turner and Floyd assisted with the discovery of Dossey's Dome Cave in 1912 and Great Onyx Cave in 1915. Later in 1915, Floyd's mother died due to tuberculosis and Lee Collins married a Mammoth Cave guide's widow, Serilda Jane "Miss Jane" Buckingham.

Great Crystal Cave

In September 1917, while climbing up a bluff on the Collins farm, Floyd noticed cool air coming from a hole in the ground. Upon widening the hole, he was able to drop down into a cavity that was part of a passage blocked by breakdown. In December 1917, after further excavation of the breakdown, Floyd discovered the sinkhole entrance to what he would later name "Great Crystal Cave." Lee Collins deeded Floyd a half interest in the cave and they immediately decided to commercialize it. After tremendous preparation by the entire family, the transformed show cave was opened to tourists in April 1918. However, the cave attracted a low number of tourists due to its remote location.

Sand Cave – 1925 incident

Collins hoped to find another entrance to the Mammoth Cave or possibly an unknown cave along the road to Mammoth Cave, and draw more visitors and greater profits. He made an agreement with three farmers, who owned land closer to the main highway. If he found a cave, they would form a business partnership and share in the responsibilities of operating this tourist attraction. Working alone, within three weeks, he had explored and expanded a hole that would later be called "Sand Cave" by the news media. Collins managed to squeeze through several narrow passageways, one of which was reported as no larger than 9" tall, and claimed he had discovered a large grotto chamber, though it was never verified. He worked on creating a more practical entrance to the grotto for hours a day and weeks on end in order to make it easier for tourists to access. On January 30, 1925, after several hours of work, his gas lamp began to dim. He had to leave quickly, before losing all light to the chamber, but became trapped in a small passage on his way out. Collins accidentally knocked over his lamp, putting out the light, leading to misplacement of his foot on what seemed to be a stable wall of the cave. The passage shifted and he was caught by a  rock that fell from the cave ceiling, pinning his left leg; as well as torrents of loose gravel to completely bury his body. He was trapped  from the entrance.

Neighbors began to worry for Floyd the next day, and sought out to find him. Though none of them were brave enough to take on the smaller passages it took to reach Collins, they were able to get close enough to communicate with him and learn he was trapped. His younger brother Homer was soon phoned to the scene, and was the only person able to make it through the small passages to get to Floyd before reporter Skeets Miller, Lieutenant Robert Burdon of the Louisville Fire Department, and family friend Johnnie Gerald crossed the boundary in the coming days. Homer brought Floyd food and liquids to retain his energy, and many ideas were thought up by locals and tourists alike as techniques to get Floyd out of the cave. On February 2, 1925, a plan was devised to hoist Collins from the cave using a harness, rope, and the strength of multiple men. This attempt failed and it injured Collins, pulling his torso directly upwards and against the ceiling of rock above him. Rescuers ultimately decided the best way to get him out was to dig out each rock that surrounded him and leverage the large rock off his foot.

Eventually, an electric light was run down the passage to provide him lighting and some warmth. Due to the attention the disaster gained, hundreds of inexperienced cave explorers and tourists stood outside the mouth of the cave. The cool winter air caused them to light campfires that disrupted the natural ice within Sand Cave, causing it to melt and create puddles of cool water; one of which Floyd himself lay in. On February 4, the cave passage collapsed in two places due to the ice melting. Attempts were made to dig the passages that led to Floyd back out, but rescue leaders, led by Henry St. George Tucker Carmichael, determined the cave impassable and too dangerous, which brought the decision to dig a shaft straight down to reach the chamber behind Collins. Collins survived for more than a week while rescue efforts were organized. The cave drew air inward, meaning no engineered equipment could be used to dig into the cave, as the fumes would suffocate Collins in the process. A  shaft would have to be dug downwards with nothing but pickaxes and shovels. By , workers hit boulders under the surface and began to use pickaxes. A series of pulley systems were used to remove rocks from the hole, but the pace of work slowed as they dug nearer to Collins. A radio amplifier had been jerry-rigged to the copper wire that connected Collins's light bulb. A scientist believed the amplifier could detect vibrations whenever Collins moved. The amplifier crackled 20 times every minute, a hopeful sign that Collins might be breathing.

On February 11, 1925, tests showed that Collins' light bulb had gone out, meaning there was no way to tell if he was still alive. The  shaft and subsequent lateral tunnel intersected the cave just above Collins, but when he was finally reached on Monday, February 16, by miner Ed Brenner, he was "cold and apparently dead." Having been appointed as the members of a coroner's jury, Floyd's friend, Johnnie Gerald, and a few other acquaintances of Floyd were allowed to go into the lateral tunnel and positively identify the body. Dr. William Hazlett and Captain C.E. Francis, a National Guard medical officer, were then unsuccessful in an attempt to reach the body, but Brenner went in front of them to the body and was able to follow their examination instructions for the official death declaration to be made. It was estimated Floyd had been dead for three to five days, with February 13 being the most likely date. Because he could not be reached from behind, the rescuers could not free his leg. Carmichael decided that Floyd's body would be left in place and the shaft would be filled with debris. After being allowed to enter the shaft, Skeets Miller and another reporter corroborated Carmichael's claim that it would be too dangerous to retrieve the body.

Media attention

Newspaper reporter William Burke "Skeets" Miller from The Courier-Journal in Louisville reported on the rescue efforts from the scene. Miller, of small stature, was able to remove a lot of earth from around Collins. He also interviewed Collins in the cave, receiving a Pulitzer Prize for his coverage and playing a part in Collins' attempted rescue. Miller's reports were distributed by telegraph and were printed by newspapers across the country and abroad, and the rescue attempts were followed by regular news bulletins on the new medium of broadcast radio (the first broadcast radio station KDKA having been established in 1920). Shortly after the media arrived, the publicity drew crowds of tourists to the site, at one point numbering in the tens of thousands. Collins' neighbors sold hamburgers for 25 cents. Other vendors set up stands to sell food and souvenirs, creating a circus-like atmosphere. The Sand Cave rescue attempt grew to become the third-biggest media event between the world wars. (The biggest media events of that time both involved Charles Lindbergh—the trans-Atlantic flight and his son's kidnapping—and Lindbergh actually had a minor role in the Sand Cave rescue, too, having been hired to fly photographic negatives from the scene for a newspaper.) Since the nearest telegraph station was in Cave City, some miles from the cave, two amateur radio operators with the callsigns 9BRK and 9CHG provided the link to pass messages to the authorities and the press.

Burials and exhibition of body

With Collins's body remaining in the cave, funeral services were held on the surface. Homer Collins was not pleased with Sand Cave as his brother's grave, and two months later, he and some friends reopened the shaft. They dug a new tunnel to the opposite side of the cave passage and recovered Floyd Collins' remains on April 23, 1925. The body was taken that day to Cave City for embalming at J.T. Geralds and Brothers funeral home. Following a 2-day visitation at the funeral home, on April 26, 1925, his body was transported to the Collins family farm and buried on the hillside over Great Crystal Cave, which Lee Collins renamed "Floyd Collins' Crystal Cave." In 1927, Lee Collins sold the homestead and cave to Dr. Harry Thomas, dentist and owner of Mammoth Onyx Cave and Hidden River Cave. The new owner placed Collins' body in a glass-topped coffin and exhibited it in Crystal Cave for many years. On the night of March 18–19, 1929, the body was stolen. The body was later recovered, having been found in a nearby field, but the injured left leg was missing. After this desecration, the remains were kept in a secluded portion of Crystal Cave in a chained casket. In 1961, Crystal Cave was purchased by Mammoth Cave National Park and closed to the public. The Collins family had objected to Collins' body being displayed in the cave and, at their request, the National Park Service re-interred him at Mammoth Cave Baptist Church Cemetery, Mammoth Cave, Kentucky in 1989. It took a team of 15 men three days to remove the casket and tombstone from the cave.

Legacy
Collins' life and death inspired the musical Floyd Collins by Adam Guettel and Tina Landau, as well as one film documentary, several books, a museum and many short songs.

In 2006, actor Billy Bob Thornton optioned the film rights to Trapped! The Story of Floyd Collins and a screenplay was adapted by Thornton's writing partner, Tom Epperson. However, Thornton's option expired and the film rights were acquired by producer Peter R. J. Deyell in 2011.

Fiddlin' John Carson and Vernon Dalhart recorded "The Death of Floyd Collins" in 1925.

John Prine and Mac Wiseman recorded "Death of Floyd Collins" on their 2007 album Standard Songs for Average People.

See also

 Moose River Disaster, mine cave-in covered extensively on radio in 1936

References

Further reading

External links

 Tragedy at Sand Cave (U.S. National Park Service)
 Cave Wars - Mammoth Cave National Park (U.S. National Park Service)
 The Tragedy of History's Smallest Underground War

1887 births
1925 deaths
Accidental deaths in Kentucky
American cavers
American explorers
Burials in Kentucky
Caving incidents and rescues
People from Logan County, Kentucky